Doncaster (1870 – January 1892) was an English Thoroughbred racehorse and sire. He was the winner of the 1873 Epsom Derby and the sire of the great stallion Bend Or. Through Bend Or he is the direct male-line ancestor of most modern thoroughbreds.

Breeding
Doncaster was foaled at the Sledmere Stud, Yorkshire, Great Britain and was sired by "The Emperor of Stallions", Stockwell, who had won both the 2,000 Guineas and the St. Leger Stakes; Stockwell was a leading sire during his later years, producing many classic winners. Doncaster's dam Marigold had a fairly good career on the track, and was sired by The Derby winner Teddington.

Doncaster, a chestnut with a white blaze originally named "All Heart and No Peel", was raised at the Sledmere Stud before he was sent to the Tattersalls auction. James Merry bought the colt for 950 guineas, changed his name to Doncaster (after the racecourse), and sent him to trainer Robert Peck.

Racing career
The colt did not compete as a two-year-old, partially due to a kick to the stifle. Doncaster began racing as a three-year-old, first appearing at the 2,000 Guineas (where he was unplaced to winner Gang Forward). He won his next race (the Derby) easily. He then raced in the Grand Prix de Paris, finishing third to winner Boiard, before being beaten by a head at the St. Leger. He did not do well in his next run, the Grand Duke Michael Stakes, but finished his season second in the Newmarket Derby.

His four-year-old career was respectable, with a dead heat second place with Flageolet in the Ascot Gold Cup (won by Boiard), before a win at the Goodwood Cup. As a five-year-old, he won both the Ascot Gold Cup and the Alexandra Plate; the races were two days apart.

At stud
Doncaster was then retired. Peck purchased him for £10,000 and immediately selling the stallion to the Duke of Westminster (for whom he was also a trainer) for £14,000. The Duke had been searching for a stallion prospect, with a good pedigree and racing record, to stand at his Eaton Stud in Cheshire. Doncaster was bred to the mare Lily Agnes (by Macaroni), who produced the filly Farewell, a 1,000 Guineas winner. Doncaster's most famous son was Bend Or, the Derby winner and prolific sire. Noted offspring were:

Empress Elisabeth of Austria saw Doncaster while visiting Eaton, and reportedly fell in love with him. She eventually purchased him, for £5,000, and he lived at her Kisber Stud until his death at the age of 22 in January 1892. His blood lives on through his son, Bend Or.

Pedigree

See also
List of historical horses
Bend Or
Stockwell (horse)
The Baron (horse)

References

External links
Bloodlines
Thoroughbred Heritage – Doncaster

1870 racehorse births
1892 racehorse deaths
Racehorses trained in the United Kingdom
Racehorses bred in the United Kingdom
Epsom Derby winners
Thoroughbred family 5-e